Warner Music Group's labels include the following.

Flagship labels

Atlantic Records
Elektra Records
Parlophone Records
Warner Records

Atlantic Records Group

 1st & 15th Entertainment
 All Money In
 Artist Partner Group
 Asylum Records
 Atlantic Records
 
 Atco Records
 Avang Music
 Big Beat Records
 Big Tree Records
 Boulevard Boyz
 Canvasback Music
 Cat Records
 Guwop Enterprises
 808 Mafia Records (joint venture with 808 Music Group & Boominati Worldwide 
 CBE
 Chop Shop Records
 Taylor Gang Entertainment (joint with EMPIRE, for JR Donarto & Berner respectfully) 
 Tha Mvmnt
 Sniper Gang Records
 Chopper City Records
 Cotillion Records
 CTE World
 Custard Records
 Eardrum Records
 Esperanza Records
 First Priority Music
 Fort Knocks Entertainment
 Full Surface Records
 F-Stop Music
 FNC Entertainment
 Grind Or Die Label
 Human Re Sources
 LaSalle Records
 Little David Records
 Luke Records
 Maybach Music Group
 Owsla
 Nest
 Photo Finish Records
 Poe Boy Music Group
 Rebel Rock Entertainment
 Spinnin' Records
 Congo Records
 CONTROVERSIA
 Dharma Worldwide
 DOORN Records
 Heartfeldt Records
 Hysteria 
 Kryteria Records
 Maxximize Records
 Mentalo Music
 Musical Freedom Records/AFTR:HRS
 Night Service Only
 OZ Records
 SOURCE
 SINPHONY
 Spinnin' Deep
 Spinnin' NEXT
 Spinnin' Premium
 Spinnin' Records Asia
 Spinnin' Talent Pool
 SPRS
 Tonco Tone
 Wall Recordings
 Stone Flower Records
 TAG Recordings
 Top Stop Music
 UpFront Records
 300 Entertainment 
 Vortex Records                                                                                                                      
 X5 Music Group
 Cake Jamz Records

300 Elektra Entertainment

300 Entertainment
Elektra Records
Asylum Records (back catalog)
EastWest Records America (back catalog)
Black Cement
DCD2 Records
DTA Records
Fueled by Ramen
Low Country Sound
Roadrunner Records
Public Consumption Recording Co.

Warner Records

12Tone Music
143 Records
A&E Records 
 Action Theory Records 
Artery Recordings
Beluga Heights 
BME Recordings 
Doghouse Records
 Facultad de Némea (San José del Rincón, México)
Festival Mushroom Records (includes Mushroom/Festival back catalogs)
 Globetown Music
Helium 3 
Ice Age Entertainment 
Jet Life Recordings
 Loveway Records 
Machine Shop Recordings
 Malpaso Records 
Maverick Records 
Nonesuch Records                                                                                                                    
Slash Records
Parlophone (excluding artists like Coldplay)
 Perezcious Music
Perfecto Records 
Playmaker Music 
Public Broadcasting Service
Reprise Records 
RuffNation Records 
Sire Records                                                                                                                  
 Red Weather Records (Orlando, Florida)
Stateside Records
Top Rank Records (reissues)

Parlophone Label Group

Parlophone Records, including reissues from the back catalogs of:
Chrysalis Records (UK, part)
EMI Columbia Records
EMI Records (UK)
Harvest Records (UK)
Virgin Records (UK)
Regal Recordings
FFRR Records
Kling Klang Produkt
Marv Music (joint-venture with film production company Marv Studios)
Pink Floyd Records (British and European distribution only)
Stateside Records (British distribution only)
Top Rank Records

Rhino Entertainment

Atco Records
Bearsville Records
Del-Fi Records
Eleven: A Music Company
Jubilee Records
Rhino Records
Roulette Records
TK Records

Rhino handles the American distribution of reissues from the UK back catalogs of Chrysalis (part), EMI Columbia, EMI, Harvest, and Parlophone.

Warner Music Nashville
Atlantic Records Nashville
Warner Records Nashville
Elektra Records Nashville
Marcus Music

Alternative Distribution Alliance

3CG Records
5 Minute Walk
679 Recordings
Acony Records
Adrenaline Music
Alligator Records
Alma Records
Alta Note Records
Anzic Records
Artist First
Arhoolie Records
Avitone Records
Bar/None Records
Barsuk Records
Beggars Group
Bieler Bros Records
Blind Pig Records
Bloodshot Records
Blix Street Records
Blisslife Records
Blue Corn Music
Blue Horizon
Bolero Records
Born & Bred Records
Brash Records
Breakbeat Science Records
Bright Antenna
Canyon Records
Carpark Records
Cavity Search Records
CDBaby
Chesky Records
Chime Entertainment
Chiyun Records
Chrysalis Records 
Comedy Central Records
Compass Records
Cordless Recordings
Courgette Records
Crunchy Frog Records
Curb Records
David Lynch Music Company
Dcide Records
Decaydance Records
Dentro Recordings
DimeRock Records
Divendy Records
Domino Recording Company
Downtown Records
Dualtone Records
East West Records
Eco Records
el Music Group
Everfine Records
Eyeball Records
Ferret Music
Kontor Records
Funzalo Records
Guelmi Music
Hellcat Records
I Scream Records
Igualdade Vision Records
InVogue Records
Jemp Records
Lightyear Entertainment
Mascom Records
Masquerade Recordings
Macklemore Inc.
Matador Records
Mayhem Records
Manifesto Records
Merge Records
Metade Note Records
Milan Records
Misfits Records
Metropolis Records
Music Branding
Mute Records 
Napalm Records
Born & Bred Records
Nervous Records
Nettwerk
Nexchapter
No Filter Records
Nuclear Blast
Nudgie Records
Om Records
Phony Records
Polyvinyl Record Company
Projekt Records
PRT Records
Pye Records
Punahele Records
Relapse Records
Restless Records
Rhymesayers Entertainment
Rhythmbank Entertainment
Rise Records
Rock Ridge Music
Rykodisc Records
Saddle Creek Records
Sanctuary Records
Bronze Records
Castle Records
CMC International
GWR Records
Sideonedummy Records
Skeleton Crew
Slugfest Records
Stony Plain Records
Strictly Rhythm Records
Sub Pop Records
Surfdog Records
Tee Pee Records
Teleprompt Records
The Control Group
Thirsty Ear Recordings
Thrill Jockey Records
TML Entertainment
Tommy Boy Entertainment
Touch & Go Records
Troubleman Unlimited
Ubiquity Records
Upstream Records
Vice Records
VMG Recordings
Warcon Enterprises
WaterTower Music
Wichita Records
Williams Street Records
Word Entertainment
DaySpring Records
Myrrh Records
Word Records
You Entertainment
Zappa Records

Arts Music
Sesame Street Records
First Night Records
Mattel Music
Sh-K-Boom Records

Warner Classics 

Warner Classics Records 
Erato Records 
Teldec Records
NVC Arts Records
Lontano Records
Finlandia Records

International labels

Warner Music International
Warner Music International (formerly WEA International) is the international copyright holder and distributor for North American artists on the Warner Music record labels. An example of this is on the credits for the American artists albums which states i.e. "Warner Bros. Records, Inc. for the U.S. and WEA International, Inc. for the world outside the U.S."

WEA is also referred to as Warner Music International or Warner Music Entertainment and has divisions worldwide such as Australia, Japan and all over Europe. These branches are usually called Warner Music followed by the name of the country. Some labels have more than one record company for example the UK has Warner Bros. Records UK and Atlantic Records UK but both trade through Warner Music UK, Limited. These labels market and distribute artists in those specific regions are all part of WEA International/Warner Music International

Europe
Spinnin' Records (acquired in 2017)

As Warner Music
Teldec
Mariann Grammofon AB
 Warner Music UK 
 Warner Records UK (formally WEA Records UK Ltd.)
East West Records
Atlantic Records UK    
Asylum Records UK            
Rhino UK - new division of Warner Music UK, formed in 2010 for reissues and compilation.
A&E Records (formerly the independent label Mushroom Records UK)
London Records (originally the U.S. label for Decca)
679 Recordings 
14th Floor Records
Warner Music Sweden
 Warner Music Spain 
 Warner Music Portugal
Parlophone Portugal (acquisition; formerly EMI-Valentim de Carvalho)
 Warner Music Poland 
EMI Music Poland (defunct; formerly Pomaton-EMI)
 Warner Music Russia
 Atlantic Records Russia
 S.B.A./Gala Records (acquisition)
 Sony Music Russia (distribution)
 Warner Music Norway 
 K. Dahl Eftf.
 Warner Music Benelux
 Atlantic Records Benelux
 Warner Music Belgium
 Warner Music Netherlands
 Warner Music Central Europe
 Atlantic Records Germany
 Warner Music Austria
 Warner Music Germany 
 Warner Music Switzerland
 UDR Records
 Warner Music Italy 
 Warner Music Ireland
 Warner Music Greece
 Warner Music France (formerly WEA Filipacchi Music)
 ADA France
 Parlophone France
 Delabel
 Décibels Productions
 Elektra France
 Nous Productions (acquired in 2016)
 Warner Music Finland                         
 Finnlevy (acquisition)
 Fazer Records
 Evidence
 Helsinki Music Company (HMC)
 Warner Music Baltics
 Warner Music Denmark 
 Medley
 Warner Music Czech Republic
 EMI Czech Republic (renamed Parlophone in 2013)
 1967 Ltd
 Must Destroy Records (distribution)
 The Beats (labels deal)
 Warner Strategic Marketing (warner.esp)
 Warner Music Romania
 Roton (until 2020)
 Global Records (since 2020)

As Parlophone Label Group
EMIDISC
Parlophone Europe Generic
Parlophone Music France (formerly Pathé Marconi-EMI)
Pathé Records
Hostile Delabel
Livin' Astro
Parlophone Music Spain (formerly EMI Odeon and Hispavox)
Hispavox
Odeon Records
Parlophone Czech Republic (formerly Monitor-EMI)
Parlophone Slovakia
Parlophone Denmark (formerly EMI-Medley)
Parlophone Norway
Parlophone Sweden
2CD Originals Series

South America
 Warner Music Argentina 
 Warner Music Brasil 
 Banguela Records (defunct) 
 Caravela Records
 EH Brasil
 Furacão 2000
 Selo Chantecler
 Selo Continental / East West Records
 WEA Discos
 RW Produtora
 Warner Strategic Marketing Brazil
 Warner Music Chile
 Warner Music Colombia
 Warner Music Perú

Asia-Pacific

Australia/Oceania
Warner Music Australia 
Warner Music New Zealand 
Illegal Musik

Asia
Gold Typhoon
 Warner Music China
 Warner Music Hong Kong 
 F Records
 Whet Drops
 Warner Music India 
Maati 
Sky Digital (distribution)
Always Music Global 
Indie Music Label (distribution)
 Warner Music Indonesia
 Hemagita Records (acquisition)
 Virgo Ramayana (distribution)
 Alfa Records
 Indo Semar Sakti
 Warner Music Israel
 Warner Music Japan (ワーナーミュージック・ジャパン)
 A.K.A. Records
 A'zip Music
 Atlantic Records Japan
 CUBE LOVES MUSIC! (joint venture with Nissan Motors)
 Defstar Records (1997-2000, now a sublabel of Sony Music Japan)
 Dream Machine
 East West Records Japan (formerly MMG Records)
 Entrance
 Fueled By Mentaiko (Joint venture with WACK)
 Futurista
 Garland
 Jupiter
 Minami
 Moon
 N.A.T.
 Organon
 PASION RECORD!
 Photon
 Planets
 Real Note
 River Way (defunct after Makihara left Warner)
 Reprise Records Japan
 Rhino Records Japan
 Roadrunner Records Japan
 root of style
 SAMURAI ROCK
 Sprouse
 TACO RECORDS
 Trinitas
 unBORDE
 Vybe
 Warner Sunset
 WEA Japan
 World Art
 Warner Music Korea
 Brand New Music (co-distributed with Kakao M)
 Vitamin Entertainment (acquired in 2007)
 WS Entertainment (joint venture with the SK Group and LOEN Entertainment, now defunct) 
 Warner Music Malaysia
 Ramada Records (Dangdut record label, now defunct)
 Zamrud (Nasyid music label)
 Roslan Aziz Productions
 Warner Music Philippines 
 PressPlay.ph 
 Sora Music Group
 Universal Records (1977-1992)
 Warner Music Singapore 
 Music Street (acquired in 2005)
 Play Music (acquired in 2005)
 Warner Music Taiwan (華納唱片) 
 UFO Records (acquisition)
 Warner Music Thailand  
 D-Day (acquisition)
 Muser (acquisition)
 Wayfer Record (acquisition in 2013)
 Warner Music Turkey
 Warner Music Vietnam
 SpaceSpeakers

See also

References

Lists of record labels

American music-related lists